Zama (also, Ayres) is an unincorporated community in Attala County, Mississippi, United States. A post office operated under the name Ayres from 1891 to 1908 and under the name Zama from 1918 to 1964. On April 27, 2011, a tornado hit the Zama area as part of the 2011 Super Outbreak, causing heavy tree and power line damage.

References

Unincorporated communities in Attala County, Mississippi
Unincorporated communities in Mississippi